Galore: The Singles 1987–1997 is the second singles compilation by The Cure. It contains singles from the years 1987–1997. The song "Wrong Number" is the only new song on the album.

Release 
Galore was first released in the US on 28 October 1997 by record label Elektra. It was then released in the UK and Europe by Fiction on 3 November. It spans the singles from the second part of the Cure's career, beginning with their seventh album Kiss Me, Kiss Me, Kiss Me and ending with their tenth album Wild Mood Swings. The Cure introduced the album with two full-length shows in October 1997 at the American Legion Hall in Los Angeles and Irving Plaza in New York City.

A single, "Wrong Number", was released in United States in November 1997.

Reception 

Galore has been generally well received by critics. Stephen Thomas Erlewine of AllMusic praised the album, writing "Galore emphatically confirms the Cure's status as one of the best and most adventurous alternative bands of the '80s." Nathan Brackett and Christian Hoard from The Rolling Stone Album Guide wrote that "Galore collects the best of the late Eighties/early Nineties Cure, plus a load of late filler", and were more reserved in their praise, describing the record as a "feeble remix album."

Track listing

Tracks 1–4 originally appeared on Kiss Me, Kiss Me, Kiss Me, tracks 5–8 appeared on Disintegration, tracks 9–10 appeared on Mixed Up, tracks 11–13 appeared on Wish, and tracks 14–17 appeared on Wild Mood Swings. Remixed versions of 11 of these tracks are included on Galore.

Personnel
Robert Smith – vocals, guitar, production
Simon Gallup – bass guitar
Porl Thompson – guitar
Boris Williams – drums
Roger O'Donnell – keyboards
Lol Tolhurst - drums, keyboards
Perry Bamonte – keyboard, guitar
Jason Cooper – drums, percussion

Production
Mark Saunders – production, engineering, mixing
Steve Lyon – production, mixing
Chris Parry – mixing
Adrian Sherwood – mixing
David M. Allen – production
Stuart Hawkes – remastering at Metropolis Mastering

Charts

Certifications

See also
Standing on a Beach – The Cure's first decade-spanning singles collection, for the years 1978–1985

References

1997 compilation albums
The Cure compilation albums
Fiction Records compilation albums
Elektra Records compilation albums